Vejendla railway station (station code:VJA) is an Indian Railway station, located in Vejendla of Guntur district in Andhra Pradesh. It is situated on Guntur–Tenali section and is administered by Guntur railway division of South Central Railway zone. It is classified as NSG6-category station in the division. The station is equipped with a rail yard for handling departmental Trains and track machines.

History 
The station was once a junction with Vejendla–Tsundur section, which is now a defunct section of the division. As a part of doubling and electrification works on the Tenali–Guntur section, commissioned on 26 April 2019, the station was also re-constructed with two new platforms.

See also 
 List of railway stations in India

References 

Railway stations in Guntur district
Railway stations in Guntur railway division
Railway stations on Guntur-Tenali line